Giovanni Caccamo (born 8 December 1990 in Modica, Sicily), is an Italian singer-songwriter. 
After being discovered by singer Franco Battiato and producer Caterina Caselli, he won the Newcomer's section of the Sanremo Music Festival 2015, with the song "Ritornerò da te", and released his debut album, Qui per te.

He also worked as a television presenter, and he dubbed the character Uku in the Italian version of Pixar's short film Lava. As a songwriter, he penned songs for Italian recording artists Malika Ayane, Francesca Michielin and Emma Marrone.

Early life
Giovanni Caccamo started singing as a child. In 2001, during a Zecchino d'Oro TV special celebrating the Mother's Day, he performed as part of the Piccolo Coro dell'Antoniano, a children's choir from Bologna.

Career
In 2009, Caccamo began working in RAI, as part of the cast of the Rai Gulp's show Music Gate, produced by Rai Ragazzi and the Institute of Antoniano.

In the summer of 2012, he met Franco Battiato and opened some of his tours, including special shows with Antony and the Johnsons.

On 15 August 2013, he released his first single, "L'indifferenza" written by himself and produced by Franco Battiato and Pino Pinaxa Pischetola.

From November 2013, he started performing in several private homes throughout Italy and Europe, singing and playing piano, as part of his Live at Home Tour. The initiative was taken in March 2015 in anticipation as part of the official tour of Qui Per Te. During that time, he was part of the radio show Edicola Fiore hosted by Rosario Fiorello.

In October 2014, he signed a recording contract with Sugar Music.

In 2015, he competed in the 65th edition of the Sanremo Festival and won in the newcomers' section with the song "Ritornerò da te. He also received the "Mia Martini Critics" Award, the Emanuele Luzzati prize, and the Sherman Press Award (Press Radio-TV). The song anticipated his first studio album Qui per te, which peaked at number 29 of Italian Albums Chart. During 2015 Caccamo wrote songs for Emma Marrone, Francesca Michielin, Deborah Iurato and Malika Ayane.

In January 2016 Caccamo participated at Sanremo Music Festival. The chosen song "Via da qui", a duet with Deborah Iurato, is inserted in the singer's second studio album Non siamo soli. The album became his second top30 on Fimi's chart and have collaboration with Federica Abbate, Malika Ayane and Carmen Consoli.

On July 26, 2016, together with Andrea Bocelli, Carly Paoli, David Foster, is one of the protagonists of "Music For Mercy", an event that celebrated the Jubilee of Mercy at the Roman Forum.

On November 10, 2016, "Dialogue with my mother", the first epistolary novel by Giovanni, published by Rizzoli.

From November 19 to December 10, 2016, he conducted with Francesca Fialdini, the 59th edition of the Zecchino d'Oro.

He has since then appeared in many concerts and music festivals, including as an opening act for famed singer Biagio Antonacci. In 2017 he was the lyricist for Elodie's second studio album Tutta colpa mia and for Chiara Galiazzo.

On January 14, 2017 he was appointed Ambassador for UNESCO.

In October 2017 he began his television adventure as a Tutor in the school of “Amici”, broadcast on Saturdays on Canale 5 and daily on Real Time.

9 February 2018, after his participation in the 68th edition of the Sanremo Festival with the homonymous song "Eterno" and the success of “Puoi fidarti di me", the main theme song of the soundtrack of the movie “Puoi baciare lo sposo" by Alessandro Genovesi, the third album by the Sicilian singer-songwriter is published. The single Eterno has exceeded 8 MLN of views and 4 MLN of streaming, reaping a great success.

On October 6, 2018, he sings for Pope Francis, in the Sala Nervi in Vatican City, on the occasion of the "Synod of Young People".

On 8 February 2019 he is a guest at the Sanremo Festival with Patty Pravo.

His “Eterno Tour” has exceeded 50 performances reaching Lima, Santiago, Rancagua, Tokyo, Budapest, Cairo, Tunis, Algiers.

On 26 April 2020, he represents Italy, at the "Pathway to Paris: Earth Day 50" Festival, with Michael Stipe of R.E.M., Patti Smith, Johnny Depp, Flea of Red Hot Chili Peppers, Cat Power, Ben Harper and many other artists. The concert, organized by Jesse Paris Smith and Rebecca Foon, celebrated the 50th anniversary of Earth Day.

On 17 September 2021, he published his fourth studio album, “Parola”, with many collaborations: Willem Dafoe, Aleida Guevara, Patti Smith, Jesse Paris Smith, Liliana Segre, Michele Placido, Beppe Fiorello. 
The theme of this concept album is ‘Word’ – the word that travels between music, prose, cinema, and literature. Each song is introduced by the text that inspired it, read by an exceptional voice and accompanied by an evocative musical carpet, like a ‘literary window’. The narrative and melody will then merge into the beginning of the corresponding song.

Discography

Studio albums

Singles

Writing credits

Sanremo Music Festival entries

Filmography

References

Living people
1990 births
Italian singer-songwriters
People from Modica
Sanremo Music Festival winners of the newcomers section
21st-century Italian singers
Musicians from the Province of Ragusa